Polkasonic is an album by the American polka band Brave Combo. It was released through Cleveland International Records in 1999. In 2000, the album won Brave Combo the Grammy Award for Best Polka Album. It was the third Grammy nomination and first win for the band.

Track listing
 "Down at the Friendly Tavern" (Wisniewski) – 1:54
 "Red Wing" – 2:32
 "Why Oh Why" – 2:44
 "Polka Dancer" (Stankovic) – 2:22
 "Only for Love" (Finch) – 2:39
 "Apples, Peaches, Pumpkin Pie" (Irby, Jr) – 2:43
 "Conchita, the Waitress" (Hernandez) – 3:09
 "Skytrain" (Finch) – 3:23
 "Glamorous Gal" – 3:27
 "Down in the Valley" – 3:43
 "Crumbling Heart" (Oberaitis) – 1:34
 "Purple Haze - The Jimi Hendrix Polka" (Jimi Hendrix) – 1:54

Personnel
 Jeffrey Barnes – harmonica, vocals, woodwind, electronic horn
 Sunana Batra – project coordinator
 Brave Combo – arranger, producer
 Adam Clark – engineer
 Joe Cripps – percussion, vocals
 Eric Delegard – engineer
 Alan Emert – drums
 Carl Finch – guitar, accordion, arranger, keyboards, vocals, producer, liner notes
 Bubba Hernandez – bass, tuba, vocals
 Danny O'Brien – trumpet
 Frank Vale – mastering

See also
 Polka in the United States

References

External links
 Brave Combo's official site

1999 albums
Brave Combo albums
Grammy Award for Best Polka Album